Henry Fieldman (born 25 November 1988) is a British rowing coxswain. He has been twice a world champion.

Rowing career
Fieldman competed at the 2014 World Rowing Championships in Bosbaan, Amsterdam, where he won a silver medal steering the coxed pair of Alan Sinclair and Scott Durant. The following year he was part of the British team that topped the medal table at the 2015 World Rowing Championships at Lac d'Aiguebelette in France, where he won a gold medal in the coxed pair with Nathaniel Reilly-O'Donnell and Matthew Tarrant.

In 2016 he coxed Oliver Cook and Callum McBrierty to another gold medal at the 2016 World Rowing Championships. 

He won a bronze medal at the 2018 World Rowing Championships in Plovdiv, Bulgaria, in the stern of the British eight with James Rudkin, Alan Sinclair, Tom Ransley, Thomas George, Moe Sbihi, Oliver Wynne-Griffith, Tarrant and Will Satch. The following year he won another bronze medal at the 2019 World Rowing Championships in Ottensheim, Austria in the eight with George, Rudkin, Josh Bugajski, Sbihi, Jacob Dawson, Wynne-Griffith, Tarrant and Thomas Ford.

In 2021, he won a European gold medal in the eight in Varese, Italy.

References

External links

Henry Fieldman – British Rowing profile

1988 births
Living people
British male rowers
World Rowing Championships medalists for Great Britain
Rowers at the 2020 Summer Olympics
Medalists at the 2020 Summer Olympics
Olympic medalists in rowing
Olympic bronze medallists for Great Britain